Central Kings (population: 329) is a rural municipality in Prince Edward Island, Canada.

Demographics 

References 

Communities in Kings County, Prince Edward Island
Rural municipalities in Prince Edward Island